Jádesọ́lá is a female Yoruba given name and also a family name, meaning "emerge into wealth." Notable people with the given name include:

 Jadesola Osiberu (born 1985), Nigerian writer
 Jadesola Akande (1940–2008), Nigerian lawyer